Crackavelli is the seventh solo studio album by American rapper Haystak. It was released on March 20, 2007 through 40 West Records and Street Flavor Records with distribution via Select-O-Hits.

Track listing

Disc 1
 "Intro" - 1:00
 "Crackavelli" - 3:44
 "I'm Haystak" - 4:33
 "Bounce Through Ya Block" - 3:50
 "Trouble Man" - 4:37
 "Make You Fly" - 4:45
 "Track 7 ft. Bun B" - 3:57
 "Boss Status" - 3:58
 "Kindness For Weakness" - 4:21
 "Reloaded" - 4:29
 "You Soft" - 3:52
 "Baked" - 4:46
 "Fall Through The Club" - 5:13
 "Freak Show" (skit) - 1:17
 "Freak Show" - 3:50

Disc 2
 "Welcome To Nashville" - 0:30
 "Nashville" - 4:15
 "Angels" - 5:02
 "My Lyrics" - 3:35
 "Drive" - 3:51
 "Excess Weight" - 4:36
 "Let's Ride" - 3:50
 "Pray For Me" - 3:56
 "Nothing Is Wrong" - 4:47
 "Respect" - 4:14
 "Special Kinda Girl" - 4:19
 "Sail On" - 5:30
 "Rap Money" - 3:04
 "Change" - 4:40
 "Pale Face" - 4:19

Chart history

References

2007 albums
Haystak albums